Pedro Hernández Martínez (born 2 October 1978 in Madrid), known simply as Pedro, is a Spanish former professional footballer who played as a right back, currently assistant manager of CD Leganés.

External links

1978 births
Living people
Footballers from Madrid
Spanish footballers
Association football defenders
La Liga players
Segunda División players
Segunda División B players
Tercera División players
Atlético Madrid C players
Atlético Madrid B players
Albacete Balompié players
Ciudad de Murcia footballers
CD Castellón footballers
CD Leganés players
CD Toledo players
Real Madrid CF non-playing staff